Gustaw Przeczek (30 May 1913 – 21 February 1974) was a Polish writer, poet, teacher and activist from the Zaolzie region of Cieszyn Silesia.

He was born in a large coal miner's family in the village of Łazy which lies in the coal basin. He graduated from schools in Orłowa and Łazy and in 1933 from a teachers' seminary in Ostrava. Przeczek later taught as a teacher in Polish schools in Bystrzyca and Łazy.

During World War II he was arrested during mass arrests of Polish intelligentsia and in 1940-1945 incarcerated in Dachau and KL Gusen I concentration camp. In the latter camp Przeczek was forced to quarry granite in Gusen and Kastenhofen stone pits.

After the war he administered a Polish school in Orłowa and in 1951-1970 was a director of the Polish elementary school in Trzyniec. Przeczek leaned towards communism and in 1954-1960 was a member of the National Assembly of Czechoslovakia from the Communist Party. He was there a member of the Cultural Committee. He was also active in several cultural and literary organizations, most notably the Polish Cultural and Educational Union and its Literary-Artistic Section. Przeczek edited and contributed to Polish magazines for children Jutrzenka and Ogniwo, and wrote several textbooks for Polish schools in Czechoslovakia. He was also a member of Polish editorial staff of the Profil publishing house in Ostrava.

Przeczek wrote poetry, prose and also plays. His literary work is influenced by his incarceration in Nazi concentration camps. In KL Gusen I (Mauthausen) Przeczek met other poets, Poles Konstanty Ćwierk, Mieczysław Paszkiewicz, Grzegorz Timofiejew and Zdzisław Wróblewski; and Czech Raimund Habřina. They wrote poems on a paper from cement bags; these poems spread among inmates and were recited. Przeczek's first works after his return focused on the life in the concentration camp. He published his camp poems in 1946 in the poetry collection Serce na kolczastych drutach (Heart on the Barbed Wire), his experiences from the camp were published in 1948 in the book Kamienna Golgota (Stony Golgotha).

Przeczek's motive of hard labour in the concentration camp can be observed from the fragment of Z lagrowej ulicy (From the Camp Street) poem from his poetry collection Serce na kolczastych drutach (Heart on the Barbed Wire):

Gustaw Przeczek died on 21 February 1974 in a hospital in Hradec Králové during a heart operation and is buried in Trzyniec.

Works 
 Serce na kolczastych drutach (1946) - poetry collection
 Złota wolność (1947) - play
 Kamienna Golgota (1948)
 Ondraszek (1948) - play
 Powiew wolności (1948) - play
 Drogi i ścieżki (1958) - poetry collection
 Tędy szła śmierć (1969) - novel
 Odnajdywanie siebie (1976) - short stories collection

Footnotes

References 
 

 

 

1913 births
1974 deaths
Polish educators
Polish male poets
Polish politicians
Polish communists
Polish people from Zaolzie
Dachau concentration camp survivors
Mauthausen concentration camp survivors
Communist Party of Czechoslovakia politicians
20th-century Polish poets
People from Orlová